Kentucky Route 1727 (KY 1727) is a  state highway in the U.S. State of Kentucky. Its southern terminus is at Johnsontown Road in Louisville and its northern terminus is at KY 1934 in Louisville.

Major junctions

References

1727
1727
Transportation in Louisville, Kentucky